Archibald Rawlings (2 October 1891 – 11 June 1952) was an English footballer who played for Preston, as well as earning one cap for the England national team.

References

External links
Player profile at EnglandStats.com
Player profile at EnglandFC.com
Profile on www.lfchistory.net

1891 births
1952 deaths
Footballers from Leicester
English footballers
England international footballers
Shirebrook Miners Welfare F.C. players
Wombwell F.C. players
Barnsley F.C. players
Northampton Town F.C. players
Rochdale A.F.C. players
Dundee F.C. players
Preston North End F.C. players
Liverpool F.C. players
Walsall F.C. players
Bradford (Park Avenue) A.F.C. players
Southport F.C. players
Burton Town F.C. players
English Football League players
Darfield United F.C. players
Association football midfielders
Scottish Football League players